John Fisher (May 22, 1771 – April 22, 1823) was a United States district judge of the United States District Court for the District of Delaware.

Education and career

Born on May 22, 1771, near Lewes, Delaware Colony, Province of Pennsylvania, British America, Fisher read law in 1791. He entered private practice in Dover, Delaware from 1791 to 1812. He was clerk for the Delaware General Assembly. He was Secretary of State of Delaware starting in 1802, and again starting in 1811.

Federal judicial service

Fisher was nominated by President James Madison on April 22, 1812, to a seat on the United States District Court for the District of Delaware vacated by Judge Gunning Bedford Jr. He was confirmed by the United States Senate on April 23, 1812, and received his commission the same day. His service terminated on April 22, 1823, due to his death in Smyrna, Delaware. He was interred at the Cemetery of Christ Church (Episcopal) in Dover.

References

Sources
 
 

1771 births
1823 deaths
Secretaries of State of Delaware
Judges of the United States District Court for the District of Delaware
United States federal judges appointed by James Madison
19th-century American judges
People from Lewes, Delaware
United States federal judges admitted to the practice of law by reading law